David Speiser (born 27 August 1980 in Oberstdorf) is a German snowboarder. He competed in the men's snowboard cross event at the 2006 Winter Olympics, placing 32nd, and the 2010 Winter Olympics, placing eighth.

References

1980 births
Living people
German male snowboarders
Olympic snowboarders of Germany
Snowboarders at the 2006 Winter Olympics
Snowboarders at the 2010 Winter Olympics
People from Oberstdorf
Sportspeople from Swabia (Bavaria)
21st-century German people